Sandra Laoura (born 21 July 1980 in Constantine, Algeria) is a French freestyle skier of Algerian origin who competed at the 2006 Winter Olympics in Turin, Italy.  Laoura won bronze in the women's moguls event.

On 5 January 2007, during a training session for a World Cup event at Mont Gabriel (Quebec, Canada), she landed on her head and fractured two thoracic vertebrae. She underwent surgical intervention aiming to repair the fractured vertebrae, but lost the use of her legs. She traveled to both Portugal and Russia for intensive rehabilitation therapy.

References

1980 births
Living people
Sportspeople from Constantine, Algeria
French female freestyle skiers
Algerian emigrants to France
Olympic freestyle skiers of France
Olympic bronze medalists for France
Freestyle skiers at the 2002 Winter Olympics
Freestyle skiers at the 2006 Winter Olympics
Olympic medalists in freestyle skiing
Medalists at the 2006 Winter Olympics